The 1969–70 Football League Cup was the tenth season of the Football League Cup, a knockout competition for England's top 92 football clubs. The competition started on 12 August 1969 and ended with the final on 7 March 1970.

The final was contested by First Division team Manchester City and First Division side West Bromwich Albion at Wembley Stadium in London. Jeff Astle opened the scoring for Albion after five minutes, becoming the first player to score in the final of both the League Cup and FA Cup at Wembley. He had already scored in the first leg of the 1966 League Cup Final four years previously at West Ham United's Boleyn Ground. City equalised through Mike Doyle to send the game into extra-time, and eventually won 2–1, with Glyn Pardoe scoring the winner.

This was the first season in which all ninety-two football league clubs competed in the tournament.

Calendar
Of the 92 teams, 36 received a bye to the second round (teams ranked 1st–35th in the 1968–69 Football League, plus 1969 League Cup winners Swindon Town) and the other 56 played in the first round. Semi-finals were two-legged.

First round

Ties

Replays

Second Replay

Second round

Ties

Replays

Second Replays

Third round

Ties

Replays

Fourth round

Ties

Replays

Fifth Round

Ties

Replays

Semi-finals

First Leg

Second Leg

Final

The final was held at Wembley Stadium, London on 7 March 1970.

References
General

Specific

EFL Cup seasons
1969–70 domestic association football cups
Lea
Cup